Koryakino is a rural locality (a village) in Plesetsky District, Arkhangelsk Oblast, Russia. The population was 233 as of 2010. There are 3 streets.

Geography 
Koryakino is located on the Kena River, 121 km southwest of Plesetsk (the district's administrative centre) by road. Stepanovskaya is the nearest rural locality.

References 

Rural localities in Plesetsky District